Golden Grove Central Districts is a Baseball club playing the South Australian Baseball League. Known as the Dodgers, their home ground is Illyarrie Reserve in Surrey Downs.

The club is a merger of the previous, Golden Grove Baseball Club and the Central Districts Baseball Club. The name Dodgers was kept over the Bulldogs of which the Central Districts were known as.

The current club coach is Clayton Carson along with fellow imports Garrett Vail (catcher) and Tim Flight (Left-handed Pitcher).

References

External links
Golden Grove Central Districts Baseball Club

Australian baseball clubs
Sporting clubs in Adelaide